Mustapha Moustawdaa or Moustawdae (Arabic:  مصطفى مستودع; born 28 September 1968) is a Moroccan international footballer. Quick and skillful, he is considered one of the best strikers in the history of Moroccan football.

He spent most of his career playing for Moroccan club Raja CA. He helped the club win two champions leagues in three years in 1997 and 1999 and took part in the 2000 FIFA Club World Cup where he was one the team's best players. He's also the only Moroccan player to have won three Champions League titles, in 1989, 1997 and 1999.

Honors
Raja CA
Moroccan League: 1996, 1997, 1998, 1999, 2000
Coupe du Trône: 1996
CAF Champions League: 1989, 1997, 1999
CAF Super Cup: 2000
Afro-Asian Cup: 1998

References

1968 births
Living people
Moroccan footballers
Raja CA players

Association football midfielders